List of companies formerly listed on the New Zealand Exchange, by date of delisting.

Companies listed and delisted before 1992 may be hard to find data for as no archiving structure had been set up before then.

Former constituents and announced departures
This is an incomplete list, you can help by expanding it

All listing dates are to the earliest known listing date

References

Exchange delisted